The 2021–22 Arema F.C. season is Arema's 32nd competitive season. The club will compete in Indonesia League 1. Arema Football Club a professional football club based in Malang, East Java, Indonesia. The season covers the period from 21 January 2021 to 31 March 2022.

Squad information

First team squad

Transfers

In

Out

Loan In

Loan Out

Review and events 
This season will be the first season for the coach Carlos Oliviera having been appointed as Arema's coach on 17 September 2020 to replace Mario Gómez who resigned in August 2020.
Last season Arema FC was in the 12th position before the season competition 2020 was postponed due to COVID-19 pandemic in Indonesia until finally canceled by PSSI after being delayed several times by referring to the results of the PSSI Executive Committee (Exco) meeting which took place virtually on 20 January 2021. However, on 7 February 2021 Arema management will not renew the head coach contract Carlos Oliviera. Carlos Oliviera contract itself will expire on 17 February 2021 and after that date he will be relieved of duty. And the temporary position of head coach was replaced by assistant coach Kuncoro during the pre-seasons tournament 2021 Menpora Cup. On 3 May 2021, Arema officially announced a new coach namely Eduardo Almeida.

Arema also experienced the longest unbeaten run in the 2021–22 season for 23 matches. Started in week 4 against PSIS Semarang with a 0–0 draw and had to stop in week 27 when they lost in the Super East Java Derby against Persebaya Surabaya with a final score of 1–0. At the end of the season, Arema placed 4th in the Liga 1 standings for the 2021–22 season.

Pre-seasons and friendlies

Friendlies

Menpora Cup

Group stage

Match results

Liga 1

Matches

League table

Statistics

Squad appearances and goals

|-
! colspan=14 style=background:#dcdcdc; text-align:center|Goalkeepers

|-
! colspan=14 style=background:#dcdcdc; text-align:center|Defenders

|-
! colspan=14 style=background:#dcdcdc; text-align:center|Midfielders

|-
! colspan=14 style=background:#dcdcdc; text-align:center|Forwards

|-
! colspan=14 style=background:#dcdcdc; text-align:center|Players transferred or loaned out during the season the club 

|}

Top scorers
The list is sorted by shirt number when total goals are equal.

References

External links 
 Arema F.C. Official website
 Arema F.C.'s Profile on Liga 1 Official Website  
 

Arema FC seasons
Indonesian football clubs 2021 season